Siddhirganj, is one of the oldest industrial cities of Bangladesh. It is located in the bank of Shitalakshya River, Narayanganj. The Siddhirganj Industrial Zone has more than 15 thousand factories and industrial establishments. Adamjee Jute Mills was established in Siddhirganj in 1951 and was once the largest jute mill in the world. This city is also one of the largest exporter in the country.  In 2018–2019, the Adamjee export processing zone in Siddhirganj exported more than 4 billion US dollars' worth of goods.

History 
From ancient times, Siddhirganj was famous Due to its favorable geographic location, Siddhirganj was historically used as a port city and specialized in muslin production from hand looms. As a gateway to Dhaka, Narayanganj's economic activities were largely contributed by Siddhirganj, and it was also called the Dundee of the East.

The traditional art of weaving Jamdani muslin in Bangladesh was included in the list of Masterpieces of the Oral and Intangible Heritage of Humanity by UNESCO. In the liberation war of Bangladesh, war hero Shafi Imam Rumi's major target was to bomb the Siddhirganj Power Station.

Power station 
Siddhirganj has four power stations total and manufacturing more than 400 MW in electricity generation capacity. A new power station called the Siddhirganj Peaking Power Project is set to be completed by 30 June 2018 after 10 years of construction at a total cost of $470 million.

References 

Populated places in Dhaka Division